Esther-Mirjam Sent (born 9 March 1967) is a Dutch economist, academic researcher, university professor, and politician. She has been the chairwoman of the Labour Party since 2021. Before that, she was a member of the Senate from 7 June 2011 to 7 October 2021.

References

External links 
 
 Esther-Mirjam Sent, official website

1967 births
21st-century Dutch politicians
Chairmen of the Labour Party (Netherlands)
Dutch women in politics
Labour Party (Netherlands) politicians
Living people
Members of the Senate (Netherlands)
People from Doesburg